Education Facilitators, a privately held company in South Africa, was a holding and operating company in the education management industry that consisted of three trading divisions, one in professional services and two college brands that operated throughout southern and central Africa from its founding in 1994 to its closure in 2005.

The two Colleges operated as distance learning institutions and offered programs for formal diplomas, degrees and postgraduate qualifications to adults studying part-time in the fields of teacher education, business administration and policing. Education Facilitators had agreements with various higher education institutions including the University of Port Elizabeth (name has changed to the Nelson Mandela Metropolitan University) and the Technikon Pretoria (name has changed to the Tswane University of Technology), which provided for the offering of their qualifications on the group's distance learning infrastructure. In addition to the above, Education Facilitators also obtained recognition from various education authorities namely, the Department of Education in South Africa, the Ministry of Education in Zambia, the SERTEC (Certification Council for Technikon Education) in South Africa, and its Colleges was accredited by the Accrediting Commission of the (DETC) Distance Education and Training Council in Washington DC, USA. This enabled the group to develop their own certificate, diploma and degree qualifications, such as Associate, Bachelor of Commerce, Bachelor of Business Administration and Master of Business Administration programs. At its peak, the group had approximately 28,000 registered students throughout southern and central Africa, awarded more than 20,000 certificates, diplomas and degrees and employed 250 plus full and part-time employees.

Business Overview of Education Facilitators

Education Facilitators was established in 1994 after a buy-out of the shareholders in Norite Education and Training Company. Initially, Education Facilitators offered education programs through distance learning for the upgrading of unqualified and under qualified in-service teachers, which was based on the curriculum and syllabi of the teacher training programs offered by the DET (the former Department of Education and Training) at Colleges of Education throughout South Africa. Education Facilitators had its Head Office in Johannesburg and was registered by order of the court in terms of the Higher Education Act, 1997 (Act No 101 of 1997).

During 1996 Education Facilitators entered into agreements with the University of Port Elizabeth (name has changed to the Nelson Mandela Metropolitan University) and the Technikon Pretoria (name has changed to the Tswane University of Technology). The programs offered by the two Colleges in collaboration with these two institutions through distance learning were examined and certified by these institutions. In addition, the programs offered by the Colleges for Technikon qualifications, were examined and inspected by the SERTEC (Certification Council for Technikon Education), which was a statutory body. Certification by these examining bodies meant that all instructional programmes complied with the norms and standards of education prescribed by the SERTEC and the Department of Education. All certificates issued by the former Technikon Pretoria to students of the Colleges were therefore issued in conjunction with SERTEC. Furthermore, all certificates awarded were recognised externally for employment, promotion and further education purposes.

The increase in student numbers compelled the operating company of the Colleges to establish a Professional Services division.  Since 1999 the professional services division was gradually upgraded from a position where personnel and student support was dealt with by an integrated HR, IR, Finance, ICT and logistics back office with a clearly defined value chain and service-level agreements.

Very little changes occurred in the marketing procedures of the Colleges.  Advertisements were placed in selected magazines and newspapers and student advisors travelled from region to region to counsel and register new students.  Thereafter, the Professional Services division dealt with telephone enquiries, as well as applications that were received via either traditional or electronic methods.

The group's commitment to responding positively to the education needs of the peoples of Africa, and to provide quality programs and excellent service in the fields of education, business administration and policing that assisted learners to develop the necessary skills and competency to enhance their careers were evident in the growing numbers of successful graduates. The Colleges also acknowledged that it had a positive role to play in enhancing the establishment and maintenance of a prosperous and self-sufficient democratic society in the countries that it operated in.

Brief History of Education Facilitators

1990	The Norite Education and Training Company started in Johannesburg with the development of distance learning programmes from the curriculum and syllabi of the Colleges of Education that the DET.  Its Chief Education Officer, Dr Mocke, furnished the company with information to develop programs for upgrading of teachers’ qualifications through distance learning.

1991	Teachers in the former Ciskei region enrolled for its Diploma in Education.

1992	Teachers in the former regions of KaNgwane and QwaQwa enrolled for its Diploma in Education.

1994	Education Facilitators was established after buying out the shareholders in the Norite Education and Training Company.

1994	Teachers in the former independent state of Bophuthatswana registered for its Diploma in Education.

1995	The first democratically elected parliament of South Africa approved a new democratic constitution.

1996	Dr Manganyi, Director General of Education, approved that all teachers with a Diploma in Education registered up to 1995 with the Colleges    
of Education Facilitators be certified as recognized qualifications for employment and salary promotion purposes.

1996	First foreign teachers in Namibia enrol for its Diploma in Education.  Appointed first group Rector and Principal.

1996	Certification agreement with the University of Port Elizabeth to offer Teacher Education and Business Management qualifications through distance learning.

1996	Certification Agreement with the Technikon Pretoria to offer Teacher Education and Police Administration qualifications through distance learning.

1998	SERTEC (Certification Council for Technikon Education) inspection of Education Facilitators and subsequent approval of its Colleges to continue offering Technikon qualifications.

1998	First group of Bachelor of Technology degrees in Education Management awarded. First group of Tutored Master of Philosophy in Education candidates registered.

1999	Appointed first Managing Director: Africa and Education Facilitators’ three-year business plan was approved for restructuring and investment into Professional Services, new product offerings and increased marketing spend.

1999	Support agreement with Technikon South Africa for global library services.
	
2000	SAQA (South African Qualifications Authority) approval was obtained and institutional registration in terms of the Higher Education Act completed.

2001	Colleges received accreditation from the Accrediting Commission of the DETC (Distance Education and Training Council) in Washington DC,    which is recognized by the State Secretary of Education and the Federal Department of Education national accrediting agency.

2002      Unbundles South African and African operations into two independent entities. Closes College in South Africa and sells Professional Service division through a Management Buy-out. Sells African Colleges by of a Leveraged Buy-out.
2003     A further contract successfully negotiated with Tswane University of Technology, by the new director GF Knight.    
2008       Company in South Africa closed officially.

Business and Service Providers to Education Facilitators

 Monotix Information Systems
 Dannhauser Accountants and Auditors
 Van Niekerk Roos Auditors
 Xerox South Africa
 Bond Stationers
 Assenmacher Attorneys
 Edutel
 Standard Bank
 Barclays Bank
 Alcatel South Africa
 MTN
 Roger Tinsley Insurance Brokers
 Momentum
 AMR Advertising South Africa
 Oracle South Africa

External links
Official Facebook Page
Nelson Mandela Metropolitan University
Tswane University of Technology

Education in Gauteng
Education companies of South Africa
Companies based in Johannesburg